Doctors is a British medical soap opera which began broadcasting on BBC One on 26 March 2000. Set in the fictional West Midlands town of Letherbridge, the soap follows the lives of the staff and patients of the Mill Health Centre, a fictional NHS doctor's surgery, as well as its sister surgery located at a nearby university campus. The following is a list of characters that first appeared in Doctors in 2020, by order of first appearance. All characters are introduced by the programme's executive producer, Mike Hobson. January saw the introduction of prison inmate Leon Sharma (Jonas Khan) and prison guard Vincent Manning (Laurence Saunders), as well as rabbi David Klarfeld {Simon Schatzberger}, a love interest for Valerie Pitman (Sarah Moyle). In February, police officer Jasmine Dajani (Lara Sawalha) was introduced as a love interest for Emma Reid (Dido Miles), as well as Abz Baker (Amy Bowden), a foster child, and university students Lex Whitmore (Eleanor House) and Jaime Mallinson (Joe Ashman).  Businessman Harvey Marshall (Louis Dempsey) appears in March, and April sees Jayden Hunt (Ciaran Stow) introduced as a foster child of Rob (Chris Walker) and Karen Hollins (Jan Pearson). Married couple Tanya (Leila Mimmack) and Mark Rees (Kiefer Moriarty) are introduced in May, as well as temporary midwife Deborah Kovak (Jamie-Rose Monk). Temporary receptionist Lily Walker (Verity Rushworth) begins appearing in June. Aashiq Sawney (Raj Ghatak) is introduced in November as another love interest for Emma, as well as foster children Tom (Max True) and Ella Robson (Lily-Mae Evans). Additionally, multiple other characters appear throughout the year.

Leon Sharma
Leon Sharma, portrayed by Jonas Khan, first appeared 6 January 2020 and made his final appearance on 30 April 2020. Leon was introduced as the cellmate of Jimmi Clay (Adrian Lewis Morgan). When Jimmi reveals he is a doctor, he laughs and does not believe him. Leon reveals to him that before Jimmi arrived, his former cellmate committed suicide. Leon disappears, so Jimmi assumes he has been released, but Leon reappears two months later. John Butler (Richard Huw) instructs Leon to stab Jimmi, and when Vincent Manning (Laurence Saunders) sees the incident, Leon is taken away. After Jimmi is proven to be innocent and is released from prison, Leon asks him to visit him in prison, where he asks for a favourable victim personal statement.

Vincent Manning
Vincent Manning, portrayed by Laurence Saunders, first appeared on 10 January 2020 and made his final appearance on 25 February 2021. Vincent was introduced as a prison guard at HMP Letherbank. When Daniel Granger (Matthew Chambers) begins working as a prison doctor at HMP, Vincent takes a dislike to him. Vincent witnesses Leon Sharma (Jonas Khan) stab Jimmi, and rushes to help him. When Jimmi is proven to be innocent, Vincent wishes him luck for the future. When Scott Lewis (Daniel-John Williams) is due for release, he punches Vincent, in hoping that it will lead to an extra charge so that he can stay in prison. Daniel advises Vincent that he does not press charges against Scott, to which he complies. Vincent is later seen dealing with Simon Robson (Tom Lister) when he punches inmate Dalton Williams (Andy Chaplin).

David Klarfeld
David Klarfeld, portrayed by Simon Schatzberger, first appeared on 21 January 2020 and made his final appearance on 24 January 2020. David was introduced as a rabbi that helps Valerie Pitman (Sarah Moyle) when she discovers that she is part Jewish. Despite Valerie not being interested in Judaism, the pair agree to see each other again, and meet at The Icon for a meal. When David brings a vulnerable patient to The Mill, Ayesha Lee (Laura Rollins) notices that he seems nervous. He later tells Valerie that he is not over his ex-wife, and is not ready for a relationship. David and Valerie agree that they are interested in each other, but it would be the wrong time to begin a relationship with each other.

Jasmine Dajani

PC Jasmine Dajani, portrayed by Lara Sawalha, first appeared on 19 February 2020 and initially left on 7 April 2020. Jasmine is introduced as a love interest for established character Emma Reid (Dido Miles). When Jasmine learns that Emma is undergoing the menopause, she brings her a bouquet of flowers. Jasmine later introduces Emma to her mother, Doris Dajani (Carla Mendonça). When Jasmine and Emma are on a date, they are the subject of homophobic comments from Derek Timbley (Pablo Raybould), and while Emma ignores him, Jasmine argues with him. Afterwards, they leave the restaurant holding hands and kissing, and a gang follows them. Gang leader Blake Atkins (Louis Stannett) makes sexually inappropriate comments, and when Jasmine threatens him, he grabs hold of Emma and assaults her, punching and kicking her. The other two gang members hold Jasmine back, and then punch her. The pair are left on the floor. After the assault, Emma tries to persuade Jasmine to report it to the police, but as Jasmine wants a promotion, she disagrees. Emma then decides that they want different things in life, and breaks up with her.

Jasmine was reintroduced by the soap for an episode in June 2022 after both herself and Emma hear that Blake wants to speak with them as part of a restorative justice programme in his prison. Emma "gets a surprise" after Jasmine asks her to lie to Blake and claim that they're still together. The pair question Blake on why he attacked them but become frustrated when he has no reasoning or answers for his attack on them. Jasmine begins to have a panic attack and she reveals to Emma that since the attack, she began having them frequently. The women have "an honest heart-to-heart" and Jasmine reveals to Emma that she wonders if they did the correct thing in breaking up, but Emma affirms that they were right to do so.

Abz Baker
Abigail "Abz" Baker, portrayed by Amy Bowden, first appeared on 21 February 2020 and made her final appearance on 5 March 2020. Abz is the temporary foster child of Karen (Jan Pearson) and Rob Hollins (Chris Walker), who is staying with the pair before leaving for university. Karen and Rob are puzzled when Abz requests to visit both of their workplaces, but admire her interest. When Karen takes her into The Mill, she spills a cup of coffee over Sid Vere (Ashley Rice). When Karen and Rob learn it is Abz's birthday, they throw her a surprise party, inviting her new university friends. Karen and Rob help Abz to move into her university accommodation, but days later, she calls Karen and says that she has been raped. Emma Reid (Dido Miles) performs a medical examination on Abz, but as she showered since the incident, little physical evidence can be found. When blood is found on her pillow, Jaime Mallinson (Joe Ashman) is taken in by the police to see if the DNA matches. When it does not match, there is no other evidence and Abz cannot remember anything else, so she retracts her statement and tells the police she lied about the incident. Jaime's girlfriend, Lex Whitmore (Eleanor House), is disgusted and ends the campaign she started to raise awareness on rape. Abz later reveals to Karen that she was raped, but does not want the case to continue. Karen finds Erin Wyn-Davies (Awen Jones), another victim of rape, who explains that her attacker has a scar on his neck. Karen and Abz persuade Lex to meet them, and Lex reveals that Jaime has a scar on his neck from his leukaemia-related operations as a child. Karen explains that due to having leukaemia, Jaime has two different DNA types, explaining why his DNA did not match. When a camera with photos of his assaults on is found, Jaime is arrested and Abz gives another statement on his assault.

Lex Whitmore
Alexis "Lex" Whitmore, portrayed by Eleanor House, first appeared on 24 February 2020 and made her final appearance on 5 March 2020. Lex is a university student that befriends Abz Baker (Amy Bowden). When Lex learns that Abz has been raped, she launches a campaign to raise awareness on sexual assaults on university campuses. Abz remembers that her attacker has a scar on his neck, and Lex reveals that when her boyfriend Jaime Mallinson (Joe Ashman) was young, he had operations for leukaemia. Lex goes into his room to look for evidence, and while on her way there, she bumps into Mal. She tells him that she left her earrings in the flat, but he finds her looking around the flat and tries to rape her, before the police arrive. Jaime is arrested for serial rape and blackmail.

Jaime Mallinson
Jaime "Mal" Mallinson, portrayed by Joe Ashman, first appeared on 27 February 2020 and made his final appearance on 5 March 2020. Jaime is introduced as the boyfriend of Lex Whitmore (Eleanor House), and a student at Letherbridge University. When Abz Baker (Amy Bowden) is raped, he is taken in by the police to give a statement and provide blood samples, as blood was found on her pillow. His blood does not match, but Lex later explains that he had leukaemia as a child. Zara Carmichael (Elisabeth Dermot Walsh) goes to the police station and explains that he has two DNA types, due to the leukaemia. Mal sees Lex on the way to his flat, but she tells him that she is going to look for her earrings. He then finds Lex in his flat looking for evidence on Abz's case, and he attempts to rape her. The police arrive before he can do anything to Lex, and they arrest him for serial rape and blackmail.

Harvey Marshall
Harvey Marshall, portrayed by Louis Dempsey, appeared from 16 to 24 March 2020. Harvey owns a nightclub in Letherbridge called The Burlow, which Al Haskey (Ian Midlane) visits to question him about his involvement in the imprisonment of Jimmi Clay (Adrian Lewis Morgan). Harvey refuses to answer Al's questions, and has his employees beat him up. Al sees Harvey with John Butler (Richard Huw), who has a grudge against Jimmi, and takes the information to the police. It is revealed that John got Harvey to order his employees to beat Jimmi up, but he is not prosecuted as he has an alibi.

Jayden Hunt

Jayden Hunt, portrayed by Ciaran Stow, first appeared on 30 April 2020 and made his final appearance on 2 November 2020. Jayden was introduced as a 14-year-old foster child with epilepsy that Karen (Jan Pearson) and Rob Hollins (Chris Walker) take in after the death of both of his parents. Jayden initially acts timid, but secretly eats much food. Karen catches him, and he retreats, but she assure him that he should make himself at home. In reply, he asks her for money for the bus to school. She gives him £20, which he thanks her for. After a day at work, Karen and Rob arrive home to find Jayden smoking a joint of cannabis. Rob fumes, stating that he cannot have him breaking the law in his house since he is a police officer. Jayden explains that he smokes it medicinally for his epilepsy. He explains that when his mother was alive, she took him to the doctors to get cannabis oil on prescription, but they would not give it to Jayden. Rob does believe him, and confiscates all of his cannabis, asking where he got the money from. Karen admits that she gave him the money for the bus, which he used to buy the drugs. Rob then tells Jayden that he will have to move out as soon as possible. After Jayden promises not to buy any more cannabis, Rob allows Jayden to stay at their house.

Karen is shocked to find Jayden having an epileptic seizure in his bedroom, and using their medical training, Karen and Rob manage to help him. Jayden tries to convince them that he is fine and does not need to go to the hospital, but Karen believes he had the seizure because he stopped smoking cannabis, and tells Jayden that she will try to get hold of some for him. Karen gets hold of cannabis from dealer Iris Nicholson (Jenny Stokes), but the amount she gives him is not enough to last him the week, so he asks her for more. Karen persuades Jayden to visit Jimmi Clay (Adrian Lewis Morgan) at The Mill for an appointment, and he tells Jimmi that cannabis has been successful for treating his epilepsy. Jimmi prescribes him new medication that has been shown to be beneficial to people with epilepsy, and he tells to Karen that the seizures affect his mental health, suggesting he may have depression, especially due to the death of his parents. When Jayden learns that he is being moved to another set of foster parents, he is upset due to feeling comfortable with Karen and Rob. Rob takes Jayden to the park to play football, and Jayden opens up about his father. He explains that when his father died, he did not feel sadness for himself, but on behalf of his mother, and he asks Rob if it is his fault his parents died, and Rob assures him that it is not.

Tanya and Mark Rees
Tanya Rees (Leila Mimmack) and Mark Rees (Kiefer Moriarty) first appeared on 11 May 2020. Tanya is a pregnant woman who is a patient of Ruhma Carter (Bharti Patel), and her husband Mark is an aspiring businessman. While eating breakfast, he insists that Tanya wishes him good luck for his upcoming job interview. While at his interview, Tanya goes to the hairdressers and has her hair done, sending a photo of it to Ruhma. She sees Valerie Pitman (Sarah Moyle) while in Letherbridge, who compliments Tanya's new hair. She asks Valerie when Ruhma will be back at work, but she cannot answer due to confidentiality. At home, Tanya is visited by her mother, Liz Smart (Tina Barnes), who expresses her dislike of Mark. Liz notices that they're having money problems, and gives Tanya £10. Mark struggles with his job interview when the presentation for his pitch crashes. He tries to salvage the interview by claiming that a high-profile businessman wants to back him, but he is the brother of interviewer Jocasta Jenkins (Soraya Radford). She calls him out on his lie, and asks him to leave. Upon Mark returning home, Tanya hides a magazine she took from the hairdressers, and makes him food. He finds the magazine, and asks her why she has spent money on having her hair done. He learns that Liz gave her money, and rolls up the magazine to beat her with it. She locks herself in the bathroom and calls Ruhma, who ignores the call due to being suspended and unable to talk to patients.

Tanya calls Ruhma the next day, who picks up, and Tanya asks her for help. Ruhma arrives at her block of flats, and Tanya runs to Ruhma's car with her bags. Mark runs after the car, but is unable to catch up with them. A day later, Ruhma visits The Mill for a prescription for Tanya, and Mark follows Ruhma home. He shows up at Ruhma's house, and demands to be let in. He breaks past her, and insists on speaking with Tanya alone. When the pair talk about Mark's abusive behaviour, he spins it around on Tanya upsetting him. Ruhma intercepts and goes to call the police, but he pushes her to the floor and is about to beat her, until Ruhma's son, Shak Hanif (Sunjay Midda), hears the commotion and pushes Mark to the floor. Ruhma calls the police, and they take Mark into the police station to be arrested. When Zara Carmichael (Elisabeth Dermot Walsh) discovers that Tanya is staying with Ruhma despite her suspension, she expresses that she does not want to get Ruhma into trouble, and packs her bags to return to the flat. Despite initially not wanting her to stay, Shak persuades Tanya not to leave. Ruhma takes Tanya to The Mill for a checkup, and she is seen by Zara. She also meets Deborah Kovak (Jamie-Rose Monk), Ruhma's replacement. Ruhma runs Tanya a bath, but hears her screaming from downstairs. She inspects her, and finds that her waters have broken, and calls an ambulance for her. After the birth, Tanya tells Ruhma that she is ready to move out and move in with Liz, as she is worried about getting Ruhma in trouble, but she insists that Tanya can stay. Tanya calls Liz, and affirms to her that she will leave, but when she discovers that it is Ruhma's birthday, she puts it off. Tanya then joins Ruhma on a holiday to Cornwall, but leaves for Liz's house afterwards.

Deborah Kovak

Deborah Kovak, portrayed by Jamie-Rose Monk, first appeared on 26 May 2020 and made her final appearance on 18 November 2020. Deborah is introduced as a temporary replacement for midwife Ruhma Carter (Bharti Patel), who is suspended from midwifery duties. Simon Timblick of What's on TV noted her "sunny personality and easy-going nature". Bear Sylvester (Dex Lee) introduces Deborah to the staff at The Mill, who are impressed with her skills when interacting with patients. Deborah accidentally reveals that Ruhma was suspended due to kissing Doug Machin (Michael Hobbs), which only Bear, Zara Carmichael (Elisabeth Dermot Walsh) and Daniel Granger (Matthew Chambers) knew. Deborah instantly feels bad for accidentally revealing it, and apologises when everyone begins gossiping about Ruhma. Deborah admits to Bear that it was her who told the staff about Ruhma's suspension, and she then meets Ruhma when Karen Hollins (Jan Pearson) introduce the pair to each other. Deborah also meets patient Tanya Rees (Leila Mimmack) in The Mill. When Tanya is sent to the hospital to give birth, Deborah discovers that Tanya has been living with Ruhma, who pleads to be with Tanya when she gives birth. Deborah is reluctant to agree due to it breaking the protocol of Ruhma's suspension, but she agrees to let Ruhma support her during the birth. The next day, Deborah goes against Ruhma in fear of somebody as the hospital reporting her, and she tells Zara and Daniel what Ruhma has done, insisting she had no part in it.

When eating lunch at The Icon with Daniel, Sid Vere (Ashley Rice) and Jimmi Clay (Adrian Lewis Morgan), she makes a comment about how all prisoners reoffend once released from prison, unaware that Jimmi has been in prison, as well as Daniel. Sid changes the topic, which Deborah thanks him for. She apologises to Jimmi, but he walks away from her. When a family needs advice on an illness, Deborah is unsure of what to tell them, and asks Emma Reid (Dido Miles) for advice; she then asks her if antihistamine tablets can affect a pregnancy, as she is unsure. Her questions lead Emma to confide in Zara about Deborah's competency as a midwife, who assures Emma that Deborah is just settling into her new employment. When Deborah learns that she was not invited to Jimmi's birthday gathering while other temporary employee Lily Walker (Verity Rushworth) was, she states to Al that Verity has wormed her way into the team by flirting, to which Al negates her claims. Al accuses her of purposely alienating herself from colleagues, which upsets Deborah, and she responds by putting on a spread of food for the staff at The Mill. Jimmi, Emma and Al make peace with Deborah. Worried that Ruhma will return, Deborah informs Grahame McKenna (Paul Bazely) that Tanya has been living with Ruhma. She then informs Zara that she would like a permanent midwife position at The Mill. However, Zara suspects that Deborah is responsible for informing Grahame about Ruhma and Tanya, and disapproving of her attitude, Zara tells Deborah to leave with immediate effect.

Lily Walker

Lily Walker, portrayed by Verity Rushworth, first appeared on 9 June 2020 and made her final appearance on 22 February 2021. Lily is employed as a temporary receptionist by Bear Sylvester  (Dex Lee). Bear gives Lily a tour of the university campus surgery, where she meets Al Haskey (Ian Midlane). Al sees Lily setting out the appointments with post-it notes, and pokes fun at her organisation system, and the pair then eat lunch together. The next day, Lily meets Sid Vere (Ashley Rice) outside of The Mill, and when he explains that he is a doctor and rapid responder, she states his partner must admire him, to which he replies that he is single. Lily then heads into the Mill to get her bag, and is locked inside by Bear. She attempts to call for help using the Mill's telephones, but as there is a power cut and her phone is in the car, she is unable to contact anyone. She sees Zachary Aldridge (Travis George) walk by, and he goes in her car to retrieve Lily's phone for her. She calls Bear, who unlocks the doors, and she then assists Zachary to the hospital to visit his ill father. On her way out, she sees Sid again, and the pair chat. The next day, she sees a personal letter for Jimmi Clay (Adrian Lewis Morgan) with the post at the Mill, and discovers it is a birthday card. She tells Al, who feels bad that he almost forgot Jimmi's birthday, and the pair plan a surprise birthday party for Jimmi. After attending Jimmi's birthday gathering, Lily and Al have sex. They initially agree that they cannot have a relationship due to being colleagues, but they continue to see each other romantically. Lily tells Valerie Pitman (Sarah Moyle), and makes her promise not to say anything, but Valerie accidentally tells Emma Reid (Dido Miles). While drunk, Lily suggests that herself and Al should get married, and he jokingly agrees. While talking to Emma, Lily has difficulty in swallowing, and says that she has had it for a number of days. Emma suggests that it may need to undergo some tests, and that cancer could be one of the explanations. She worries for a number of months that she has cancer, but she later receives confirmation that she is cancer-free. Immediately after telling Al the good news, he ends their engagement. An upset Lily begins to follow Al, and lets herself inside of his house, where she takes his jacket. He changes the locks after he notices the jacket is missing, but is shocked to learn from his mother Eve Haskey (Rachel Bell) that Lily is at her house. When Lily learns that he is rushing to Eve's house, she tries to leave, but he arrives before she can go. The pair argue over their relationship, and she affirms that she never wants to see Al again.

Rushworth stated that despite her soap experience as Donna Windsor on Emmerdale, she was "really nervous" to join Doctors. Due to the COVID-19 pandemic, production on the soap was suspended, and the three episodes that Rushworth had filmed prior to suspension were aired before the programme's return to production. She said that it was "so fortunate" for her to see the episodes before returning to filming, as "normally you'd film a whole storyline without seeing anything", adding that "the nerves went away after that". On her character, Rushworth told Inside Soap: "Lily is lovely to play. She's ditzy, but very good at her job. She's one of the girls – she likes a giggle and is a little bit kooky at times. However, she can also be one of the lads, and doesn't take herself too seriously." Rushworth also praised her character's styling, adding that the short skirts that Lily wears help her to feel "flighty and flirty". Rushworth also talked about a scene broadcast in November 2020 where her character challenges Al to a drinking competition. She stated that it was the "most hilarious, yet embarrassing day of [her] life", and that prior to the scene, she had never downed a pint before. She confirmed that they used real cider in the scene, and that she could spit it out in a nearby bucket if she wanted to, and recalled her cast members having to run off set due to laughing at her during the filming of the scenes.

When asked if Lily would become romantically involved with Al, Rushworth confirmed that there is "something bubbling" with them, and that Al makes Lily laugh. She opined that the pair would be "well-suited", and noted that they had chemistry immediately. She also stated that it is "absolutely brilliant" to film with Midlane, and that the pair became good friends throughout lockdown. She explained that that due to only filming for seven days prior to the suspension of production, she was unsure about whether cast members would keep in touch with her, expressing her joy that she talked to Midlane regularly. In a scene broadcast on 18 November 2020, Lily was portrayed by Caoimhe Farren as a body double. The scene involved Lily and Al kissing, and Farren was used as she is the real-life partner of Midlane, due to social distancing guidelines as part of the response to the pandemic.

Aashiq Sawney

Aashiq Sawney, portrayed by Raj Ghatak, first appeared on 16 November 2020 and made his final appearance on 11 February 2021. Aashiq is introduced as the instructor of an Indian cooking class that Valerie Pitman (Sarah Moyle) and Lily Walker (Verity Rushworth) plan on attending. Lily decides not to attend, and Al Haskey (Ian Midlane) attends instead. While on the course, Valerie flirts with Aashiq, asking him if he has a wife. Al does not agree with Aashiq's cooking methods, and when Aashiq samples the attendee's meals, he criticises Al's meal for its lack of flavour and texture, to which Al is insulted and quits the course. Valerie recruits Emma Reid (Dido Miles) as a replacement for Al, who Aashiq flirts with. The two arrange a date, but not wanting to upset Valerie, they keep it private. However, when Aashiq cancels a class to attend a date with Emma, Valerie is angry to find the two on having dinner. Aashiq arranges another dinner date with Emma, but cancels for undisclosed reasons. It is later revealed that he has a wife, Monita (Perveen Hussain), when she calls him and asks where he is, as it is her mother's birthday. Valerie later sees the two together and informs Emma, who forms a plan with best friend Zara Carmichael (Elisabeth Dermot Walsh) to catch him out as a cheat. Zara wears a disguise and visits his restaurant where she flirts with him, and as he reaches in for a kiss, Emma walks in and breaks up with him. Monita also witnesses the events and ends their marriage. He begs for Emma's forgiveness, but she insists that they are over.

Prior to Aashiq's arrival, a viewer on an online interview asked if Valerie would get a love interest. Producer Peter Eryl Lloyd confirmed that Valerie would be set to have a relationship in upcoming scenes, and Moyle expressed her joy at the news, having not known about the romantic development prior to the livestream. The love interest was later confirmed by What's on TV to be Aashiq. Ghatak wrote a piece on his website about his experience on the soap and portraying Aashiq. He stated that the role of "a charming restaurateur who has a twinkle in his eye for the ladies" was offered to him in March 2020, and due to having an existing contract with another television series, his agent attempted to "juggle" the scheduling of filming. However, due to the COVID-19 pandemic, filming of Doctors was suspended until the summer, when he got a call from the producers telling him to "get ready". He expressed his nervousness at filming on the soap, since he had only done voiceover work over lockdown. He confirmed that when filming commenced, social distancing was maintained. He explained that directors and crew members "mapped out the scene" to ensure it was maintained, a two-metre stick was used and that temperatures of cast members were taken at "regular intervals". He recalled that in his scenes set in the kitchen, they could not use the hobs, as the heat would increase moisture in the air, therefore increasing the risk of COVID. Talking about his character, he wrote: "Aashiq is very flirtatious, usually tactile, likes to get up close and personal with the ladies,  would probably stand slightly closer to the ladies he's attracted to, and his posture would be crotch centric". He stated that flirting from a two-metre distance was difficult, and that it was hard to make it seem "sexy". He confirmed that his exit had aired on 11 February 2021, and stated that he was sad to have left.

Tom and Ella Robson

Tom Robson (Max True) and Ella Robson (Lily-Mae Evans) first appeared on 23 November 2020 and made their final appearance on 25 February 2021. Tom and Ella are siblings who are put into foster care after father Simon (Tom Lister) admits to murdering his wife Lisa, which they witnessed. They are put into the care of Rob Hollins (Chris Walker) and Karen Hollins (Jan Pearson). Initially, Tom and Ella barely interact with Rob and Karen, but after Rob takes them out for food and to play a game of mini golf, they begin to feel comfortable in their care. After Ella overhears Rob and Karen discussing their father's prison sentence, she is upset. Karen attempts to chase after her, until Tom punches her. Feeling the two need help, they arrange for Tom and Ella to attend counselling with Jimmi Clay (Adrian Lewis Morgan). Whilst alone together, Tom forces Ella to memorise a specific account of what happened on the day of their mother's murder.

After the pair ask Karen to visit their father in prison, she makes excuses as to why they cannot visit him, since she does not want to upset them. Ella gets upset and questions why she cannot visit her father, and when Karen verbally reprimands her, Tom attacks Karen, hitting her in the rib with a pepper shaker. Karen begins to think that he is responsible for the murder of his mother due to the violence he has shown, and feels unsafe around him. She schedules more counselling sessions with Jimmi for Tom. While in a session, he admits that his father is not responsible for the murder of Lisa, but that she deserved death. He explains that Lisa used to abuse his father when she got drunk, and that one night, she was severely harming him; Ella saw what was happened and grabbed a statue from the mantlepiece and struck Lisa across the head. Karen takes Ella to school, but she does not arrive, and Karen tracks her down to her former family home. Whilst there, she admits to Karen that she killed her mother, and showed her a blood-stained shirt from the night of the murder. Rob and Karen then take Ella in for questioning at the police station. Due to the conflict of interest, social worker Carole Simmons (Anjela Lauren Smith) decides that it would be beneficial for Tom to be relocated to a different foster family. Karen and Rob then say their goodbyes to the siblings.

In an interview with Inside Soap, actor Walker, who portrays their on-screen foster father Rob, praised the performances of True and Evans. He praised them for coming to work everyday "with smiles on their faces", despite the challenging roles they are playing. He added that they are "super" in their portrayal of the children, and that himself and Pearson (Karen) get on with them "like a house on fire".

Other characters

References

Doctors
2020
, Doctors